The 2021 Durand Cup is the 130th edition of Durand Cup, the oldest football tournament in Asia. Like its previous edition, the tournament was hosted in West Bengal. The tournament is jointly hosted by the Eastern Command of the Indian Armed Forces and the Government of West Bengal.

The Durand Cup was cancelled in 2020 due to worldwide COVID-19 pandemic and was reorganised in 2021 after a year gap. Gokulam Kerala were the defending champions, having defeated Mohun Bagan in the 2019 final. 

Mohammedan made their first Durand Cup final appearance since 2013 against debutants FC Goa. The match went into the extra time with no goal from either side. Goan captain Edu Bedia's 105th minute solitary goal sealed Goa's victory against Mohammedan. Goa became the fourth Goan team to win the Durand Cup after Salgaocar, Dempo and Churchill Brothers.

Teams
A total of 16 teams participated in the competition; 5 clubs from Indian Super League, 3 clubs from I-League, 2 clubs from I-League 2nd Division and 6 teams representing the Indian Armed Forces. 

ATK Mohun Bagan and East Bengal were invited to be part of the tournament but most of the first team players of ATK Mohun Bagan were on international break and also had their AFC Cup knockouts coinciding with the Durand Cup fixtures, thus they backed out from the tournament, while East Bengal refused participation because of investor issues. Since this year India celebrates golden jubilee of its victory over Pakistan for the liberation of Bangladesh in 1971, DFTS invited Mohammedan SC and Sk. Jamal Dhanmondi Club from Bangladesh to participate in the 130th edition of the tournament. But due to the COVID-19 pandemic in Bangladesh, the clubs were unable to confirm their participation.

Prize money

Official sponsors and partners

Co-sponsors 

 Coal India
 State Bank of India
 ITC
 SERVO IndianOil

Associate sponsors 

 GAIL
Kalyani Group
 Pramerica Life Insurance
 JIS Group

Supported by 

 GRSE
 Adani Defence & Aerospace
 Tata Advanced Systems
 TABLT Pharmacy
 Gloster
 Hindustan Aeronautics

Tournament partner 

 IFA W.B.
 Cherry Tree

Streaming and radio partner 

 Addatimes
 SonyLIV (only semifinals and final)
 91.9 Friends FM

Source: Durand Cup

Venues

Group stage

Group A

Matches

Group B

Matches

Group C

Matches

Group D

Matches

Knockout stage

Bracket

Quarter-finals

Semi-finals

Final

Statistics

Top scorers

Note: Only top goal scorers with 3 or more goals are mentioned.

Hatricks 
Note: Player's team score mentioned first

Most clean sheets

Season awards

Golden glove for best goalkeeper 
 Naveen Kumar (Goa)

Golden boot for top scorer 
 Marcus Joseph (Mohammedan)

Golden ball for best player 
 Edu Bedia (Goa)

See also
 Indian Super League
 I-League
 I-League 2nd Division
 Super Cup
 IFA Shield

Notes

References

External links 
 Durand Cup website

2021 Durand Cup
Durand Cup seasons
2021 domestic association football cups
2021 Asian domestic association football cups
2021–22 in Indian football